Damien De Bohun is the former Head of the A-League. He was previously in charge of game and market development for Cricket Australia. He was announced as the new head of the A-League on 6 July 2012, and resigned in March 2016.

References 

Living people
A-League Men executives
Year of birth missing (living people)
People educated at Carey Baptist Grammar School